Stoner or stoners may refer to:

People
 Stoner (bass guitarist)
 Alyson Stoner (born 1993), American actress and dancer
 Andrew Stoner (born 1960), Australian politician, member of the New South Wales Legislative Assembly, and the Leader of the New South Wales National Party
 Casey Stoner (born 1985), Australian motorcycle racer, world champion in 2007 and 2011
 Clayton Stoner (born 1985), Canadian ice hockey player
 Dillon Stoner (born 1998), American football player
 Edmund Clifton Stoner (1899–1968), theoretical physicist
 Eugene Stoner (1922–1997), weapons designer 
 James A.F. Stoner, American author and professor
 Jesse Benjamin "J.B." Stoner (1924–2005), American white supremacist and segregationist
 Nicholas Stoner (1762–1853), Adirondack pioneer and Revolutionary War soldier
 Peter Stoner (1888–1980), professor of mathematics and astronomy and author
 Tobi Stoner (born 1984), Major League Baseball starting pitcher for the New York Mets

Fictional characters
 Stoner, in the anime series Eureka Seven
 Helen and Julia Stoner, in The Adventure of the Speckled Band, a Sherlock Holmes story by Arthur Conan Doyle
 William Stoner, eponymous protagonist of the novel Stoner, by John Williams

Music
 Stoner rock (or stoner metal), a rock music genre
 Stöner, an American stoner rock band
 "Stoner" (song), a song by American rapper Young Thug
 "Stoners" (song), a song by American pop duo Nina Sky
 Stoner Witch, an album by American rock band Melvins

Other
Stoner (novel), a 1965 novel by John Williams
 Stoner 63 (XM207), a modular 5.56 mm assault rifle/LMG
 Stoner, Colorado, a community in the United States
 Stoner SR-25 a semi-automatic sniper rifle
 Stoner (drug user)
 Stoner film, a subgenre of comedy films
 Stoner, an alternate title for the 1974 Hong Kong film The Shrine of Ultimate Bliss
 Stoners, industrial stonecutters who worked the limestone quarries of southern Indiana
 A person who throws stones during a stoning
 Pennsylvania Stoners, an American soccer team based in Allentown, Pennsylvania, United States

See also
 
 
 Stonor (disambiguation)
 Stone (disambiguation)
 Stoner Creek (disambiguation)